The U.S. Department of the Treasury Office of Inspector General (Treasury OIG) is one of the Inspector General offices created by the Inspector General Act Amendments of 1988. The Inspector General for the Department of the Treasury is charged with investigating and auditing department programs to combat waste, fraud, and abuse.

History of Inspectors General

References 

Treasury Office of Inspector General, Department of
United States Department of the Treasury
United States Department of the Treasury agencies